3753 Cruithne is a Q-type, Aten asteroid in orbit around the Sun in 1:1 orbital resonance with Earth, making it a co-orbital object. It is an asteroid that, relative to Earth, orbits the Sun in a bean-shaped orbit that effectively describes a horseshoe, and that can change into a quasi-satellite orbit. Cruithne does not orbit Earth and at times it is on the other side of the Sun, placing Cruithne well outside of Earth's Hill sphere. Its orbit takes it near the orbit of Mercury and outside the orbit of Mars. Cruithne orbits the Sun in about one Earth year, but it takes 770 years for the series to complete a horseshoe-shaped movement around Earth.

The name Cruithne is from Irish and refers to the early Picts (Old Irish: Cruthin) in the Annals of Ulster and their eponymous king ("Cruidne, son of Cinge") in the Pictish Chronicle.

Discovery 
Cruithne was discovered on 10 October 1986 by Duncan Waldron on a photographic plate taken with the UK Schmidt Telescope at Siding Spring Observatory, Coonabarabran, Australia. A 1983 precovery (1983 UH) is credited to Giovanni de Sanctis and Richard M. West of the European Southern Observatory in Chile.

It was not until 1997 that its unusual orbit was determined by Paul Wiegert and Kimmo Innanen, working at York University in Toronto, and Seppo Mikkola, working at the University of Turku in Finland.

Dimensions and orbit 

From 1994 through 2015, Cruithne made its annual closest approach to Earth every November.

Although Cruithne's orbit is not thought to be stable over the long term, calculations by Wiegert and Innanen showed that it has probably been synchronized with Earth's orbit for a long time. There is no danger of a collision with Earth for millions of years, if ever. Its orbital path and Earth's do not cross, and its orbital plane is currently tilted to that of Earth by 19.8°. Cruithne, having a maximum near-Earth magnitude of +15.8, is fainter than Pluto and would require at least a  reflecting telescope to be seen.

Cruithne is in a normal elliptic orbit around the Sun. Its period of revolution around the Sun, approximately 364 days in the early 21st century, is almost equal to that of Earth. Because of this, Cruithne and Earth appear to "follow" each other in their paths around the Sun. This is why Cruithne is sometimes called "Earth's second moon". However, it does not orbit Earth and is not a moon.  In 2058, Cruithne will come within 0.09 AU of Mars.

Due to a high orbital eccentricity, Cruithne's distance from the Sun and orbital speed vary a lot more than Earth's, so from Earth's point of view Cruithne actually follows a kidney-bean-shaped horseshoe orbit ahead of Earth, taking slightly less than one year to complete a circuit of the "bean". Because it takes slightly less than a year, Earth "falls behind" the bean a little more each year, and so, from the point of view of an observer on Earth, the circuit is not quite closed, but rather like a spiral loop that moves slowly away from Earth.

After many years, Earth will have fallen so far behind that Cruithne will then actually be "catching up" on Earth from "behind". When it eventually does catch up, Cruithne will make a series of annual close approaches to Earth and gravitationally exchange orbital energy with Earth; this will alter Cruithne's orbit by a little over half a million kilometres—while Earth's orbit is altered by about —so that its period of revolution around the Sun will then become slightly more than a year. The kidney bean will then start to migrate away from Earth again in the opposite direction—instead of Earth "falling behind" the bean, it is "pulling away from" the bean.

After 380 to 390 years or so, the kidney-bean-shaped orbit approaches Earth again from the other side, and Earth, once more, alters the orbit of Cruithne so that its period of revolution around the Sun is again slightly less than a year (this last happened with a series of close approaches centred on 1902, and will next happen with a series centered on 2676). The pattern then repeats itself.

Similar minor planets 
More near-resonant near-Earth objects (NEOs) have since been discovered.

Other examples of natural bodies known to be in horseshoe orbits (with respect to each other) include Janus and Epimetheus, natural satellites of Saturn. The orbits these two moons follow around Saturn are much simpler than the one Cruithne follows, but operate along the same general principles.

However, none of these follow horseshoe orbits.

In popular culture 
Cruithne plays a major role in Stephen Baxter's novel Manifold: Time, which was nominated for the Arthur C. Clarke Award for best science fiction in 2000.

Cruithne is mentioned on the QI season 1 episode "Astronomy", in which it is described as a second moon of Earth. In a later episode, it was added that, if using the same definition, Earth has over 18,000 “mini-moons”.

In Astonishing X-Men, Cruithne is the site of a secret lab assaulted by Abigail Brand and her S.W.O.R.D. team. It contains many Brood before Brand destroys it.

In the Insignia trilogy, 3753 Cruithne has been moved into an orbit around Earth to serve as a training ground for the Intrasolar Forces.  In the third novel, Catalyst, it is intentionally directed at Earth.  While it is destroyed before impact, its fragments rain down on Earth's surface, killing nearly 800 million people across the world.

In the science-fiction book series Aeon 14, Cruithne appears as an inhabited moonlet, home to 'privateers', smugglers, Terran Space Fleet (TSF) outposts and corporate headquarters. Notable inhabitants have included Ngoba Starl and Petral Dulan.

Gallery

See also 
  temporary Earth satellite discovered in 2006
 
 Co-orbital configuration
 Earth's second moon
 Natural satellite
 Quasi-satellite

References

Further reading

External links 
 Paul Wiegert's page about Cruithne, with movies
 Java-applet based animations showing Cruithne's orbit
 A simulation of Cruithne's orbit with animation (Gravity Simulator)
 Curious About Astronomy: Have astronomers discovered Earth's second moon?
Interactive 3D gravity simulation of Cruithne's orbit
 
 
 

003753
Discoveries by Duncan Waldron
Named minor planets
Earth-crossing asteroids
003753
003753
19861010